Pandab Goenda is an Indian Bengali-language television detective series that premiered on 7 September 2020, and aired on Zee Bangla. The show based on the story of Pandab Goenda, starred Rob Dey, Rishav Chakraborty, Mayukh Chatterjee, Anumita Dutta and Shritama Mitra.

List of Stories
1. Mittirder Baganbari Rohoshyo
2. Brishtimukhor Sondhya
3. Chhintai Kando
4. Bhalluk Rohoshyo
5. Chainik Chokro
6. Lalbai er Guptodhan
7. Bhairab Halder Porbo
8. Goyna Churi Rohoshyo
9. Vinayak Roy Mrityu Rohoshyo
10. Chhota Thakur Porbo
11. Rajib porbo
12. Abhimanyu Uddhar o Meghnad Badh Porbo
13. Oshotodhatur Murti Churi Rohoshyo
14. Nari Pachar Chokro

Cast

Main
 Rob Dey as Bablu aka Anirban Sen.(Leader of Pandab Goyenda)
 Rishav Chakraborty as Bilu aka Akaash Dutta.
 Mayukh Chatterjee as Bhombol aka Snehajit Das.
 Anumita Dutta as Bachchu aka Tridha Chatterjee.
 Shritama Mitra as Bichchhu aka Tirthaa Chatterjee.

Family of Pandab Goenda
 Ranjini Chattopadhyay as Swarnali Sen: Bablu's mother; Abhimanyu's wife.
 Anindya Chakrabarti / Rajib Banerjee as ACP Abhimanyu Sen: Bablu's Father; Swarnali's husband,.
 Abanti Dutta as Sucharita Chatterjee: Bachchu and Bichchhu's mother; Arunava's wife.
 Arghya Mukherjee as Arunava Chatterjee: Bachchu and Bichchhu's father; Sucharita's husband.
 Kalyani Mondal as Pishithamma: Bachchu and Bichchhu's paternal grandmother; Arunava's paternal aunt.
 Aparajita Ghosh as Brishti Dutta : Bilu's mother; Subinoy's wife.
 Avijit Sengupta as Subinoy Dutta: Bilu's father; Brishti's husband.
 Moumita Chakraborty as Shiulee Das: Bhombol's mother; Malay's wife.
 Debashis Nath as Malay Das: Bhombol's father; Shiulee's husband.

Recurring
 Samrat Mukherjee as Meghnad Malpani aka MM aka Satya Maharaaj (Fake Identity).
 Saugata Bandopadhyay as Inspector Kunal Basu.
 Oliva Bhattacharya as Officer Saheli Sarkar.
 Rahul Chakrabarty as DCP Asim Ray: Arunava's friend.
 Hiya Roy as Rai Dasgupta: Daughter of scientist Pranabesh Dasgupta, Bilu's love interest.
 Sudip Sarkar as Dr.Shikdar: RMO of Metropolitan Hospital; MM's employee.
 Phalguni Chatterjee as Tekchand Ganguly aka Tekdadu.
 Arindol Bagchi as Paban: MM's employee.
 Rumki Chatterjee as Swapna Ray aka Raykakima.
 Sankar Chakraborty ad Niloy Das: Bhombol's uncle, Moloy's younger brother.
 Bhola Tamang as the Chinese Man at Shahjahan Chinese Hotel.
 Ritoja Majumder as Piyali: Sanjay's wife.
 Bulbuli Choubey Panja as Farzana Begum / Madhumita Paul (Fake Identity): Tatai's mother.
 Avijit Sarkar as Bhairab Halder.
 Anaya Ghosh as Sampa Halder: Bhairab's wife.
 Arup Roy as Trinath Halder: Bhairab's younger brother.
 Srija Bhattacharjee as Riya Halder: Bhairab and Sampa's daughter.
 Aishwarya Sen as Kankana Sarkar aka Muniya: Bablu's (Pandab Goenda) childhood friend; Amiya's daughter; Sudeshna's step daughter; Bulan's elder step sister.
 Abhyuday Dey as Bulan: Muniya's step brother; Amiya and Sudeshna's son.
 Shaktipada Dey as Amiya Sarkar: Munia and Bulan's father; Sudeshna's husband.
 Rumpa Chatterjee as Sudeshna Sarkar: Bulan's mother, Munia's stepmother; Amiya's second wife.
 Jasmine Roy as Disha.
 Gourab Mondal as Ayan Mitra aka Ayan Kumar.
 Juhi Sengupta  as Madhushree Roy: Vinayak's wife.
 Sidhu as Vinayak Roy: The director; Madhushree's husband.
 Abhijit Guha as Pulak Bose: Vinayak's person secretary.
 Rajat Malakar as Chota Thakur.
 Sutirtha Saha as Rajib: MM's former employee; Pallavi's love interest.
 Tanushree Bhattacharya as Pallavi: Rajib's love interest.
 Gopa Nandi as Mita Sarkar (Ñee Das): Bhombol's paternal aunt; Malay's younger sister.
 Avijit Dev Roy as Rabi Sarkar: Mita's husband.
 Atreyi Bose as Shrishti: Mita and Rabi's daughter
 Biswajit Ghosh Majumder as Goutam: Tara's husband.
 Anindita Saha Kapileshwari as Rajeshwari Ray.

References

Zee Bangla original programming
Indian drama television series
2020 Indian television series debuts
2021 Indian television series endings